Niemcz  is a village in the administrative district of Gmina Osielsko, within Bydgoszcz County, Kuyavian-Pomeranian Voivodeship, in north-central Poland.

The village has a population of 2,940.

References

Niemcz